Zakovryashino is a rural locality (a selo) and the administrative center of Zakovryashinsky Selsoviet, Krutikhinsky District, Altai Krai, Russia. The population was 736 as of 2013. There are 10 streets.

Geography 
Zakovryashino is located 10 km south of Krutikha (the district's administrative centre) by road. Krutikha and Bolshoy Log are the nearest rural localities.

References 

Rural localities in Krutikhinsky District